Theakston may refer to:

Theakston, North Yorkshire
Theakston Brewery, a British brewery

People
Greg Theakston (b. 1953), American comics artist and illustrator
Jamie Theakston (b. 1971), English television and radio presenter
Joseph Theakston (1772-1842) English sculptor
Paul Theakston, founder of the Black Sheep Brewery 
Will Theakston (b. 1984), English actor